Noriega is a surname of Spanish origin, and may refer to:

Adela Noriega (born 1969), Mexican actress
Carlos I. Noriega (born 1959), American astronaut
Danny Noriega (born 1989), better known as Adore Delano, American drag queen
Eduardo Noriega (Spanish actor) (born 1973), Spanish film actor
Eduardo Noriega (Mexican actor) (1916 – 2007), Mexican film actor
José de la Guerra y Noriega (1779 – 1858), soldier and early settler of California
José María Noriega (born 1958), Spanish footballer
José Noriega (1796 – 1869), Spanish-born Californio ranchero and politician
José Noriega (Florida politician) (1788 – 1827), American politician and brickyard owner
Manuel Noriega (1934 – 2017), Panamanian politician and military officer
Manuel Noriega Ruiz (1880 – 1961), Mexican stage and film actor, screenwriter, and film director
Noriega (producer), reggaeton producer
Patricio Noriega (born 1971), former Argentine Rugby Union footballer
Roger Noriega (born 1959), U.S. diplomat and policy maker specializing in Western Hemisphere Affairs
Rick Noriega (born 1958), former member of the Texas House of Representatives
Susana Noriega (born 1952), Mexican painter
Víctor Noriega (born 1972), Mexican actor, singer and model
Victor Noriega (pianist) (born 1978), American jazz pianist
Zenón Noriega Agüero  (1900–1957), Peruvian army general

See also
Noreaga, a rapper, now known as N.O.R.E.
Noriega and Raya Naruega are Spanish names of the common skate, Dipturus batis

Surnames
Spanish-language surnames